The Telecommunications Intercept and Collection Technology Unit (TICTU) is part of the Electronic Surveillance Technology Section (ESTS) of the Federal Bureau of Investigation (FBI). Its primary function is performing surveillance of U.S. citizens.

The TICTU is in charge of operating and maintaining DCSNet, and performs millions of domestic wiretaps each year.

See also
 Carnivore (software)
 Communications Assistance For Law Enforcement Act
 DCSNET
 Mass Surveillance

References
 FBI Recorded 27 Million FISA 'Sessions' in 2006
 FOIA documents regarding TICTU (from the website of the Electronic Frontier Foundation)

Surveillance
Mass surveillance